Hugo Richard Jüngst (26 February 1853 – 3 March 1923) was a German composer and choir-leader.

Born in Dresden, Jüngst was a student of Julius Rietz. In 1876, he started the "Dresden Men's Choirs" and conducted it until 1904. He received several awards during his life and performed internationally in Europe as well as the United States.

External links
 

1853 births
1923 deaths
19th-century classical composers
19th-century German composers
19th-century German male musicians
20th-century classical composers
20th-century German composers
20th-century German conductors (music)
20th-century German male musicians
German choral conductors
German male classical composers
German male conductors (music)
German Romantic composers
Musicians from Dresden
People from the Kingdom of Saxony